Sir William John Macleay (13 June 1820 – 7 December 1891) was a Scottish-Australian politician, naturalist, zoologist, and herpetologist.

Early life
Macleay was born at Wick, Caithness, Scotland, second son of Kenneth Macleay of Keiss and his wife Barbara, née Horne. Macleay was educated at the Edinburgh Academy 1834–36 and then to studied medicine at the University of Edinburgh; but when he was 18 years old his widowed mother died, and he decided to go to Australia with his cousin, William Sharp MacLeay. They arrived at Sydney in March 1839 on HMS Royal George. William Macleay took up land at first near Goulburn, and afterwards on the Murrumbidgee River.

He is noted as the last of the naturalists in a family active in this field; his uncle was Alexander Macleay,  Colonial Secretary of New South Wales from 1826 to 1836, and a member and fellow of societies concerned with the flora and fauna of the empire's colonies.

Political career
On 1 March 1855 Macleay was elected to the old Legislative Council as member for the Lachlan and Lower Darling Pastoral District. After responsible government, on 19 April 1856 Macleay was elected to the Legislative Assembly for the Lachlan and Lower Darling serving until 11 April 1859. From 1860 to 1874 he represented Murrumbidgee in the Assembly.

Zoological career
Macleay lived in Sydney from 1857, the year he was married to Susan Emmeline Deas-Thomson, daughter of  Colonial Secretary and politician, Edward Deas-Thomson, and was now able to develop his interest in science. He had made a small collection of insects, and in 1861 began to extend it considerably. In April 1862 a meeting was held at his house and it was decided to found a local Entomological Society. Macleay was elected president and held the position for two years. The society lasted 11 years and, not only was Macleay the author of the largest number of papers, he also bore most of the expense. He had succeeded to the Macleay collection on the death of W. S. Macleay in 1865, and in 1874 decided to extend it from an entomological collection into a zoological collection. Also in 1874 the Linnean Society of New South Wales was founded, of which Macleay was elected the first president, and in May 1875, having fitted up the barque Chevert, he sailed for New Guinea, where he obtained what he described as "a vast and valuable collection" of zoological specimens.

After his return from New Guinea, Macleay fostered the Linnean Society. He presented many books and materials for scientific work to it, however all were destroyed when the Garden Palace was burnt down in September 1882. In spite of this blow the society continued on its way and gradually built up another library. In 1885 Macleay erected a building for the use of the society in Ithaca road, Elizabeth Bay, and endowed it with the sum of £14,000. He had contributed several papers to the Proceedings of the society, and in 1881 his two-volume Descriptive Catalogue of Australian Fishes was published. Three years later a Supplement to this catalogue appeared, and in the same year his Census of Australian Snakes was reprinted from the Proceedings. Macleay had hoped to make a descriptive catalogue of the Dipterous insects of Australia, but his health began to fail and it was not completed.

Legacy
Macleay realized that a lot could be done to prevent diseases like typhoid fever and strongly urged the appointment of a government bacteriologist. Receiving little support he eventually left £12,000 to the University of Sydney for the foundation of a chair or lectureship in bacteriology, but this was rejected by the university senate due to the conditions of the bequest and the money went to the Linnean Society. Nearly 40 years later a professorship in bacteriology was established from the Bosch fund. In 1890 the government having provided a building in the university grounds he handed the valuable Macleay collection to the university, together with an endowment of £6000 to provide for the salary of a curator. Macleay was knighted in 1889. He died on 7 December 1891; his wife, Susan, died in 1903 and there were no children. Macleay left £6000 to the Linnean Society for general purposes and after his wife died, £35,000 was given to the Linnean Society to provide four Linnean Macleay fellowships of £400 per annum each, to encourage and advance research in natural science.

See also
:Category:Taxa named by William John Macleay

References

External links

1884-1887; Letters received by Sir William John Macleay. Correspondents include Sir George Macleay, Sir Charles Nicholson, Henry Nottidge Moseley, George Barnard, Nikolai de Miklouho-Maclay. Also includes Macleay's commission as captain of the Sydney Volunteer Artillery in 1866 and undated biographical notes, Macleay family - papers, 1811-1887, 1920-1929, 1983-1988, State Library of New South Wales, MLMSS 6116
Macleay, Sir, William John (1820-1891) National Library of Australia, Trove, People and Organisation record for Sir William John Macleay
 

1820 births
1891 deaths
Members of the New South Wales Legislative Council
Members of the New South Wales Legislative Assembly
Australian zoologists
Australian people of Scottish descent
People educated at Edinburgh Academy
Alumni of the University of Edinburgh
Australian Knights Bachelor
19th-century Australian politicians
Macleay family